"Wrong" (stylised as "wRoNg") is a song recorded by English singer and songwriter Zayn, featuring American singer and songwriter Kehlani for his debut solo studio album, Mind of Mine (2016). It was written by Zayn Malik, Wells, Griffin, Rains, Emerson, Waviest and Kehlani Parrish, and produced by XYZ. It was released as a third and final single from the album on 7 June 2016.

Background
Zayn sung and wrote one of the songs, "wRoNg", in collaboration with American R&B singer and songwriter Kehlani. According to Malik, he "reached out to [them], played a couple of songs for [them] in L.A. and [they]'re really cool, [they] liked the music, so [they] got in the studio within a couple of days, [they] gave me a song back that [they] wanted me to do, and we just got it done straight away." Malik originally wrote "wRoNg" as a rap, which he then used to create lyrics for the song. "wRoNg" is about "looking in the wrong place for love". "wRoNg" incorporates elements from early 2000s R&B music.

Release
"wRoNg" was serviced to US rhythmic contemporary radio stations on 7 June 2016 as a single. It later impacted US urban contemporary radio on 28 June 2016.

Promotion
The track was used for ZAYN's GQ  photoshoot edition. The video was uploaded to the magazine's official YouTube account.

Charts

Release history

References 

2016 songs
2016 singles
Kehlani songs
Songs written by Zayn Malik
Zayn Malik songs
RCA Records singles
Torch songs
Songs written by Kehlani